Canada, represented by the Canadian Olympic Committee (COC), competed at the 2012 Summer Olympics in London, United Kingdom, from 27 July to 12 August 2012. Canadian athletes have competed in every Summer Olympic Games since 1900, except the 1980 Summer Olympics in Moscow because of the country's support for the United States-led boycott. Canada sent a total of 281 athletes to the Games to compete in 24 sports. The COC set a goal of finishing in the top 12 for total medals; but the nation failed to achieve this, finishing with a total of 18 medals. Canada matched its total medal count from Beijing 2008. At London, with the initiation of its "Own the Podium" programme, Canada finished 13th in total medals, thus improving on its 14th place performance in Beijing while falling somewhat short of its self-declared goal of 12th position. It finished the event with 18 medals: two gold, six silver and 10 bronze.

Canada left London winning a single gold medal, that was awarded to trampoline gymnast Rosannagh MacLennan in the women's event, its lowest count of golds in a Summer Olympic games since 1976. However, weightlifter Christine Girard, initially the bronze medallist in the women's 63 kg event, was subsequently upgraded to the gold medal position in April 2018 following the disqualification of the gold and silver medalists. This raised Canada's gold medal count to two, which still remained the nation's lowest count since 1976 where it failed to win a gold despite being the host.

Prior to Girard's being upgraded to the gold medal, Canada's performance had broken the record for the highest total medal count for a nation with only one gold medal. This was despite several Canadian athletes just missing out of the medal finishes, including the men's 4 x 100 m sprint relay team, who were disqualified after finishing in third. Canada left London with 5 silver and 11 bronze medals; the media nicknamed this the "Bronze Games" for Canada due to the disproportionate number of bronze medals won (compared to the solitary gold medal) compared to previous Olympics. Diving pair Émilie Heymans and Jennifer Abel won the nation's first medal in the women's synchronized springboard event. Heymans became the first Canadian athlete to win Olympic medals in four consecutive games. Canada also won the bronze medal match in the women's soccer tournament, the first for the nation since 1904, and the first in a traditional team sport since 1936.

Medallists

| width="78%" align="left" valign="top" |

| width="22%" align="left" valign="top" |

Medal hopes
Several Canadian athletes, considered as strong medal contenders, missed out of the podium during their final events. The men's sprint relay team, led by Jared Connaughton, held the third fastest time in the finals, but were later disqualified for a lane violation. Trampoline gymnasts Jason Burnett and Karen Cockburn missed out of winning another Olympic medal for the first time. Triathlete and two-time Olympic medallist Simon Whitfield was forced to withdraw from the men's event after suffering minor injuries from a bike crash. Springboard diver and medal favourite Alexander Despatie made a disappointing performance in the men's final event, finishing only in eleventh place. Track cyclist Tara Whitten finished fourth in a grueling two-day women's omnium event, when she was a former two time world champion in the event. Other medal failures included the female badminton team's defeat in the bronze medal match, defending champion Eric Lamaze, who failed to advance into the finals in the individual jumping event, and fourth-place finishes in swimming, specifically in the women's 4x200 freestyle relay event, and in synchronized swimming.

Delegation 
The Canadian Olympic Committee selected a team of 281 athletes, 119 men and 153 women, to compete in all sports except handball and field hockey. The nation's team size was roughly smaller by 60 athletes from the previous games. Along with the nation's athletes, Canada also sent a team of 93 coaches and 137 members from the mission staff. For the second time in its Olympic history, Canada was represented by more female than male athletes. Athletics was the largest team by sport, with a total of 45 competitors.

The Canadian team included several past Olympic champions, three of them defending (freestyle wrestler Carol Huynh, equestrian jumping rider Eric Lamaze, and the men's coxed eight rowing team). Equestrian show jumper Ian Millar became the first athlete to compete at his tenth Olympic games, and also, the oldest athlete of the team at age 65. Eight rower Lesley Thompson, Canada's oldest female athlete, made her seventh Olympic appearance, having participated since 1984 (except the 2004 Summer Olympics in Athens, where she was not selected). Gymnast Victoria Moors, on the other hand, was the youngest athlete of the team, at age 15. Other Canadian athletes featured road cyclist Clara Hughes, who competed at both Summer and Winter Olympic games, two-time silver medallist Alexander Despatie in springboard diving, multiple-time Olympic medallist Adam van Koeverden in sprint kayaking, and swimmers Ryan Cochrane and Brent Hayden.

Former backstroke swimmer and 1992 Summer Olympics gold medallist Mark Tewksbury was the nation's chef de mission, while former diver and 1984 Summer Olympics gold medallist Sylvie Bernier became an assistant chef de mission. Triathlete and double Olympic medallist Simon Whitfield was the nation's flag bearer at the opening ceremony.

| width=78% align=left valign=top |
The following is the list of number of competitors participating in the Games. Note that reserves in fencing, field hockey, football, and handball are not counted as athletes:

Archery

Canada qualified one male and female archer. Jason Lyon won a quota spot by finishing in the top 5 in the men's individual event at the 2011 World Archery Championships in Turin, Italy. However, Crispin Duenas won the right to represent Canada at the Games after winning the Olympic trials. Marie-Pier Beaudet won the continental qualification event and the Canadian trials to qualify for the 2012 Olympics.

Athletics

Canadian athletes achieved qualifying standards in the following athletics events (up to a maximum of three athletes in each event at the 'A' Standard, and one at the 'B' Standard): The team was selected based on the results of the 2012 Canadian Olympic Track & Field Trials in Calgary on 27–30 June.

Men
Track & road events

* Canada initially placed third in the 4 × 100 m relay, but were subsequently disqualified for stepping on the lane line.

Field events

Combined events – Decathlon

Women
Track & road events

Field events

Combined events – Heptathlon

Badminton

Canada qualified four badminton athletes. The team was officially announced on 18 May 2012. The women's doubles pairing of Alex Bruce and Michelle Li finished last in the round-robin portion, losing all three of their matches. However, the top two teams in the group were disqualified for attempting to intentionally lose matches so they would have an easier match-up in the quarterfinals. The duo was advanced to their quarterfinals and won, but lost in the semifinals and bronze medal game.

Basketball

Canada qualified a women's basketball team. Canada's team officially qualified on Canada Day (1 July) and became the 12th and final team to qualify for the tournament.

Women's tournament

Team roster

Group play

Quarter-final

Boxing

Canada qualified three boxers to compete in London. Two male boxers qualified at the Pan American qualification event. Mary Spencer was awarded a wildcard by the International Boxing Association.

Canoeing

Canada qualified eight canoe/kayak athletes.

Slalom
Canada qualified a boat for the following event:

Sprint
Canada qualified boats for the following events:
Men

Women

Qualification Legend: FA = Qualify to final (medal); FB = Qualify to final B (non-medal)

Cycling

Canada qualified cyclists for the following events

Road

Track
Sprint

Pursuit

Note: Laura Brown was named on the women's team pursuit squad but did not compete.

Keirin

Omnium

Legend: Q=Qualified to next round; R=Repechage

Mountain biking

BMX

Diving

Canada qualified 11 quota spots in diving. On 28 May 2012, nine athletes were announced to the team.

Men

Women

Equestrian

Canada qualified a full team in dressage and eventing team competitions through the 2011 Pan American Games. Canada qualified a team in jumping team competition.

Canada also qualified three athletes in the individual dressage competition, and 5 athletes in the individual eventing competition. They also qualified four athletes in the individual jumping competition.

Dressage

Eventing

Jumping

Fencing

Canada qualified five fencers.

Football (soccer)

Canada qualified a women's team.
 Women's team – 18 athletes

Women's tournament

Team roster

Group play

Quarter-final

Semi-final

Bronze medal game

 Won bronze medal

Gymnastics 

Canada selected a team of athletes competing in artistic, rhythmic, and trampoline gymnastics. For the second time in its Olympic history, Canada qualified for the women's artistic gymnastics team final, the first since the 1984 Summer Olympics in Los Angeles, and the first in a non-boycotting games. In trampoline gymnastics, Rosannagh MacLennan, competing at her second Olympics, won Canada's only gold medal in the women's event. Three-time Olympic medallist Karen Cockburn, however, missed out of the medal standings for the first time.

Artistic
Men

Women

Individual finals

Rhythmic

Trampoline

Judo

Canada qualified eight judokas.
Men

Women

Modern pentathlon

Melanie McCann qualified through the 2011 Pan American Games

Rowing

Canada qualified seven boats.
Men

Women

Qualification Legend: FA=Final A (medal); FB=Final B (non-medal); FC=Final C (non-medal); FD=Final D (non-medal); FE=Final E (non-medal); FF=Final F (non-medal); SA/B=Semifinals A/B; SC/D=Semifinals C/D; SE/F=Semifinals E/F; QF=Quarterfinals; R=Repechage

Sailing

Canada qualified 1 boat for each of the following events.

Men

Women

Open

M = Medal race; EL = Eliminated – did not advance into the medal race

Shooting

Canada qualified the following shooters:

Swimming

After the 2012 Canadian Olympic swimming trials held in late March in Montreal, 31 swimmers, (13 male and 18 female) an increase of four from the 2008 Summer Olympics.

Men

Women

* Tera van Beilen lost to Jamaica's Alia Atkinson in a swim-off match for the final.

Synchronized swimming

Canada qualified a duet and a team by winning the 2011 Pan American Games.

Table tennis

Canada qualified a men's team, provisionally qualifying a third athlete. Zhang Mo qualified by winning the 2011 Pan American Games.

Taekwondo

The Canadian team was selected after the senior Olympic trials held in January 2012.

Tennis

Canada qualified three singles players, and two doubles teams.

Triathlon

Canada qualified five triathletes.

Volleyball

Beach

Both men's and women's team qualified after winning the NORCECA Continental Beach Volleyball Cup.

Weightlifting

Canada obtained three women's quotas.

Wrestling

Canada qualified nine quota places in wrestling.

Men's freestyle

Women's freestyle

See also

 Canada at the 2011 Pan American Games
 Canada at the 2012 Winter Youth Olympics
 Canada at the 2012 Summer Paralympics

References

Nations at the 2012 Summer Olympics
2012
Summer Olympics